The Road: The Tragedy of One is a 2021 South Korean television series directed by Kim No-won and starring Ji Jin-hee, Yoon Se-ah, Kim Hye-eun and Kim Sung-soo. Based on the work by Rintaro Norizuki, the series tells the story of the ugly desires, secrets, guilt and salvation of 'Royal the Hill', where only the top 1% of Korea live. It premiered on tvN on August 4, 2021, and aired on Wednesdays and Thursdays at 22.30 (KST) for 12 episodes.

Synopsis
"Royal the Hill" is a posh place where top one percent of Koreans live. The series tells the secrets, desires, guilts and salvation of the residents of this place.

Baek Soo-hyeon (Ji Jin-hee) the protagonist is a trusted anchor 
with strong beliefs. His words are taken as the truth, but he is a cold-hearted man. He will use any means to get what he desires. He is married to Seo Eun-soo (Yoon Se-ah), who is a daughter of chairman of the Jegang Group, a heavy weight having influence in the political and economic worlds.

On a torrential rainy night a tragic incident takes place and the secrets connected with it result in silence, avoidance, and confusion, which eventually leads to another tragedy.

Cast

Main
 Ji Jin-hee as Baek Soo-hyeon
 Park Sang-hoon as young Baek Soo-hyun
 45 years old, BSN News night anchor, a trusted journalist, a faithful family head. He is hiding a dark secret
 Yoon Se-ah as Seo Eun-soo
42 years old, a popular miniature artist, Baek Soo-hyeon's wife, the daughter of the steel group chairman, Seo Gi-tae 
 Kim Hye-eun as Cha Seo-yeong
42 years old, BSN late night news anchor, always hungry for success

Supporting

People around Baek Soo-hyeon and Seo Eun-soo 
 Chun Ho-jin as Seo Gi-tae 
 65 years old, father of Seo Eun-soo, the president of a leading conglomerate, self-righteous and overbearing
 Kim Min-joon as Baek Yeon-woo 
12 years old, son of Soo-hyeon and Eun-su
 Kang Sung-min as Oh Jang-ho 
41 years old, documentary director, husband of Eun-soo's younger sister, Eun-ho 
 Kim Sung-soo as Sim Seok-hoon
45 years old, detective of the Metropolitan Investigation Unit, once the childhood friend of Baek Soo-hyeon from hometown, they cut off ties after a middle school girl disappeared in their hometown, Yeongsan
 Jo Seong-joon as Seo Jeong-wook 
 The son of Seo Ki-tae and Bae Baek-suk, Seo Jung-wook is someone who is afraid of Seo Ki-tae, but his name goes up and down every time he has a drug problem, including the Gap-jil case.

People around Cha Seo-yeong 
 Ahn Nae-sang as Choi Nam-gyu
 55 yrs old, husband of Cha Seo-young, a former lawyer and CEO of a large investment firm
 Lee Seo as Choi Se-ra 
21 years old, daughter of Choi Nam-gyu and his first wife.
 Nam Ki-won as Choi Jun-young 
12 years old, son of Nam-gyu and Seo-young

Steelmaking Foundation  
 Kang Kyung-hun as Bae Kyung-Sook
45 years old, chairman, steelmaking foundation, 
 Ha Min as Yang Yang
55 years old, head of planning department, steelmaking cultural foundation
 Jo Seong-joon as Seo Jeong-wook
22 years old, son of Seo Gi-tae and Bae Kyung-Sook
 Kim Roi-ha as Hwang Tae-seop
60 years old, 4th term National Assembly member
 Hyun Woo-sung as Jo Sang-mu 
Seo Gi-tae's right hand man, 40 years old, director, steelmaking Group

Press people
 Baek Ji-won as Kwon Yeo-jin
49 years old, Soo-hyeon's senior, a former news anchor and the first female director of BSN's news agency
 Oh Yong as Kang Jae-yeol 
45 years old, Newsnight producer
 Joo Ye-eun as Park Mun-hwa :33 years old, Newsnight reporter

Others 
 Lee Jong-hyuk as Yoon Dong-pil  
45 years old, CEO of a large entertainment establishment
 Jo Jung-hwan as Park Seong-hwan 
41 years old, freelance entertainment reporter and has a bad relationship with Baek Soo-hyeon
 Han Joo-wan as Kim Young-shin 
35 years old, detective of the Metropolitan Investigation Unit

Special appearance 
 Son Yeo-eun as Lee Mi-do
 35 years old, Dark Dining employee

Production
On March 30, 2021, the main cast of the drama was confirmed as Ji Jin-hee, Yoon Se-ah and Kim Hye-eun. On May 12, Yoon Se-ah posted photos from filming site. On June 25 announcing the premiere date, photos from script reading site were released.

Original soundtrack

Score

Part 1

Part 2

Viewership

References

External links
  
 The Road: The Tragedy of One at Daum 
  The Road: The Tragedy of One at Naver 
 
 

TVN (South Korean TV channel) television dramas
2021 South Korean television series debuts
2021 South Korean television series endings
Korean-language television shows
South Korean mystery television series
Television shows based on Japanese novels
South Korean thriller television series